Russell Hornsby (born May 15, 1974) is an American actor. He is known for his roles as Edward "Eddie" Sutton on ABC Family's Lincoln Heights, as Luke on the HBO drama In Treatment, as Detective Hank Griffin on the NBC series Grimm, and as Lyons in the movie Fences. He also played Carl Gatewood in the Showtime TV series The Affair.

Early life and education
Hornsby was born in San Francisco, California. He was a football player and track star at St. Mary’s College High School in Berkeley, California. He auditioned for a spring musical and got the role of the Scarecrow in The Wiz. After that, he became very interested in theatre and acting and was highly involved with the rest of the school theatrical productions. After graduating, he studied theater at Boston University, from which he graduated with a degree in performance. After graduation, Hornsby continued his studies at the British American Drama Academy.

Career
After finishing his studies at Oxford, Hornsby moved to New York City and was subsequently cast in leading roles in Off Broadway productions of To Kill a Mockingbird (as Atticus Finch), Joe Louis Blues, and Six Degrees of Separation (as Paul). In the late 1990s, he decided to move to Los Angeles in order to transition into television and film. He has appeared in several different television productions including appearing in recurring roles in Haunted as Detective Marcus Bradshaw and Gideon's Crossing as Chief Resident Dr. Aaron Boise. His other television credits include Grey's Anatomy, Law & Order, and In Justice among others. He also played running back Leon Taylor in ESPN's drama series Playmakers. On the big screen, he has appeared in such films as After the Sunset, Big Fat Liar, Get Rich or Die Tryin', Keep the Faith, Baby, Meet the Parents, and Stuck among others. In 2000, Hornsby appeared in the Off-Broadway production of Jitney for which he won a Drama Desk Award and an Obie Award.

He starred in the NBC fantasy drama Grimm from 2011 to 2017. In 2018, he played Isaiah Butler in the Netflix crime drama Seven Seconds. That same year, Hornsby joined the cast of the movie Creed II.

In 2021, he went on to star in the Starz crime drama television series BMF, with costars Eric Kofi-Abrefa, Da'Vinchi and Demetrius Flenory Jr., who played Demetrius Flenory Sr.

Filmography

Film

Television

Video games

References

External links

Male actors from Oakland, California
American male television actors
American male film actors
American male stage actors
American male voice actors
Boston University College of Fine Arts alumni
Drama Desk Award winners
Obie Award recipients
1974 births
Living people
20th-century American male actors
21st-century American male actors
African-American male actors
20th-century African-American people
21st-century African-American people